Ali Ashour Al-Jaffar (Arabic: علي عاشور الجعفر) is a writer and academic of Kuwaiti origins, who teaches at the College of Education at Kuwait University. He is editor-in-chief of Journal of Arab Children, and owner of the “Arabic storypedia” website, which publishes the summaries of children's stories in the Arab world.

His life 
Ali Ashour Al-Jaffar was born on the 15th of December, 1963 in Kuwait. He obtained a bachelor's degree in Arabic Language Teaching Methods at the College of Education at Kuwait University in 1987, and a Master's in Education at the Primary Level at Indiana University Bloomington in the United States of America in 1995, and a Doctor of Philosophy from the same university in 1998.

Career 

 Instructor at Kuwait University from 1998 to May 2006.
 Director of the Centre for Practical Education at the College of Education "Kuwait University" from 2004 to 2006.
 Director of the Master's Program in the Curriculum Department from 2010 to 2011.
 Professor, Department of Curricula and Teaching Methods, College of Education, Kuwait University, from 2006 until now.

Books 
Ashour published three collections of short stories for children by Dar Al Hadaek: "My Sister Sees by Smell", "The Square Story", and "We Make a House of Dust". His latest publication, in 2020, in titled: "The Beautiful Surprised Object: A Reading in Children's Poetic Fiction". And he has three translations of books issued by The Children of Reggio.

Awards 
Ali Ashour Al-Jafar won the award for the best doctoral thesis at the level of the Curriculum Department at the College of Education, Indiana University - Bloomington, United States in 1998. He also won the State Prize in 2016 in the field of Education for the book “Children’s Literature and Politics: Diversity and Difference.”

Reverences 

Kuwaiti writers
Kuwaiti novelists
1963 births
Living people